Vaavu Atoll is an administrative division of the Maldives, comprising the natural atolls of Felidhu Atoll and the Vattaru Reef.

It is the smallest administrative atoll in the Maldives in terms of population.

The easternmost geographical point of the Maldives is located at Fottheyo Muli, close to Foththeyo-bodufushi Island.

No remains from the Buddhist period have been found on this atoll.

Geography

Inhabited islands

Resort islands
Resort islands are classified as Uninhabited Islands which have been converted to become resorts. As of 2017, Vaavu has two resorts with 434 beds. The following are the resort islands, with the official name of the resort.

Notes
Haa Alifu, Haa Dhaalu, Shaviyani, Noonu, Raa, Baa, Kaafu, etc. (including Vaavu) are code letters assigned to the present administrative divisions of the Maldives. They are not the proper names of the natural atolls that make up these divisions. Some atolls are divided into two administrative divisions while other divisions are made up of two or more natural atolls. The order followed by the code letters is from North to South, beginning with the first letters of the Thaana alphabet used in Dhivehi. These code letters are not accurate from the geographical and cultural point of view. However, they have become popular among tourists and foreigners in the Maldives who find them easier to pronounce than the true atoll names in Dhivehi, (save a few exceptions, like Ari Atoll).

References

 Divehi Bahāi Tārikhah Khidmaiykurā Qaumī Markazu. Reprint 1958 edn. Malé 1990.
 Divehiraajjege Jōgrafīge Vanavaru. Muhammadu Ibrahim Lutfee. G.Sōsanī.
 Romero-Frias, Xavier. The Maldive Islanders, A Study of the Popular Culture of an Ancient Ocean Kingdom. Barcelona 1999.

External links
 Official Vaavu Atoll website

Administrative atolls of the Maldives
Atolls of the Maldives